Musina Local Municipality is located in the Vhembe District Municipality of Limpopo province, South Africa, and is the northernmost local municipality in South Africa. It borders on Botswana and Zimbabwe. The seat of Musina Local Municipality is Musina.

Sub places
The 2011 census divided the municipality into the following Sub Places:

Politics 
The municipal council consists of twenty-four members elected by mixed-member proportional representation. Twelve councillors are elected by first-past-the-post voting in twelve wards, while the remaining twelve are chosen from party lists so that the total number of party representatives is proportional to the number of votes received. In the election of 3 August 2016 the African National Congress (ANC) won a majority of eighteen seats on the council.
The following table shows the results of the election.

References

External links 
 Official homepage

Local municipalities of the Vhembe District Municipality